Sue Harrison may refer to:

Sue Harrison (author), writer of the Ivory Carver Trilogy
Sue Harrison (athlete) (born 1971), British long distance athlete

See also
Susan Harrison (disambiguation)